The Politics and government of Oslo reflects that Oslo is the capital of Norway, and as such is the seat of Norway's national government. Most government offices, including that of the Prime Minister, are gathered at Regjeringskvartalet, a cluster of buildings close to the national parliament—the Storting.

Governance
Constituting both a municipality and a county of Norway, the city of Oslo is represented in the Storting by seventeen Members of Parliament. The Labour Party and the Conservative Party have six each, the Progress Party and the Liberals have two each; the Socialist Left Party, the Christian Democrats and the Green Party have one each.

The combined municipality and county of Oslo has had a parliamentary system of government since 1986. The supreme authority of the city is the City Council (Bystyret), which currently has 59 seats. Representatives are popularly elected every four years. The City Council has five standing committees, each having its own areas of responsibility. These are: Health and Social Welfare; Education and Cultural Affairs; Urban Development; Transport and Environmental Affairs; and Finance. The executive branch (Byrådet) consists of the Governing mayor (byrådsleder) and currently seven vice mayors or Commissioners (byråder, sing. byråd) holding ministerial positions. The vice mayors are appointed and removed by the Governing mayor. The Governing mayor and the vice mayors can individually or collectively be voted out of office by the city council.

Since the local elections of 2019, the city government has been a coalition of the Labour Party, Green Party and Socialist Left Party. After the 2019 local elections on 9 September, the centre-left coalition remained in majority.

Mayor

The Mayor of Oslo is the head of the City Council and the highest ranking representative of the city. This used to be the most powerful political position in Oslo, but following the implementation of parliamentarism, the Mayor has had more of a ceremonial role, similar to that of the President of the Storting at the national level. The current Mayor of Oslo is Marianne Borgen.

Governing mayor

The Governing Mayor of Oslo is the head of the City Council. The post was created with the implementation of parliamentarism in Oslo and is similar to the role of the prime minister at the national level. The current governing mayor is Raymond Johansen.

Administrative divisions
Following the latest reform of 1 January 2004, the city is divided into fifteen boroughs (bydeler) that are to a considerable extent self-governed. Each borough is responsible for local services not overseen by the City Council, such as social services, basic healthcare, and kindergartens.
Sentrum (the city centre) and Marka (the rural/recreational areas surrounding the city) are separate geographical entities, but do not have an administration of their own. Sentrum is governed by the borough of St. Hanshaugen. The administration of Marka is shared between neighbouring boroughs.

References